Josefa Flores González (born 4 February 1948), known professionally as Marisol or Pepa Flores, is a retired Spanish singer and actress who was an evolving icon in Spain since her first appearance in 1960 as a child star until her retreat from the spotlights in 1985.

Early life
Marisol was born Josefa Flores González on 4 February 1948 in Málaga, Andalusia, Spain. From early childhood, she demonstrated a love of singing and flamenco dance. In 1959 she was discovered by film producer Manuel José Goyanes Martínez, who saw her on television. Marisol became a sensation both in Spain and overseas.

Professional life

A star is born 
Her passion for dance and music was passed down to her by her grandmother Victoria. She entered a choir and dance group named Los joselitos del cante belonging to the Sección Femenina's national organization . One of her first televised performances was seen by Mari Carmen Goyanes, daughter of producer Manuel Goyanes, who convinced her father that the girl she had seen on television was the actress and singer they needed. The producer convinced Pepa Flores's parents, and she finally signed an exclusive contract with them that made her a millionaire.

The career of Marisol, her artistic name, had just begun. She was extremely popular in Spain and Latin America. She received dance, acting, and declamation classes taught the best teachers, with the idea of making her the star of children's and youth cinema.

In her first film, Un rayo de luz, a huge merchandising campaign was organized around the new star, with books, dolls, cards, and all kinds of objects with the image of the girl. Each film premiere included a tour of Spain and Hispanic countries to promote it, with all kinds of events creating tumults and crowds at the airports. Televisions, interviews, and hundreds of photo shoots, in addition to the film shootings, prevented her from having a childhood like that of any other girl. Columbia Pictures wanted to buy the rights to Manuel Goyanes to continue exploiting her artistic career, but the producer rejected it.

As a singer 
Marisol was a child star during the 1960s, entertaining high-ranking dignitaries (including Francisco Franco). Director Luis Lucia Mingarro propelled her to national stardom in the film trilogy Un rayo de luz (Ray of Light), Ha llegado un ángel (An Angel Has Arrived) and Tómbola (Lottery). The films featured Marisol singing some of her best-known songs, "La vida es una tómbola" ("Life Is a Lottery"), "Corre, corre, caballito" ("Run, Run, Little Horse"), "Bambina", "Ola, Ola, Ola", "Estando contigo" ("Being with You"), "Chiquitita" ("Little Girl") and "Nueva melodía" ("A New Melody"). In 1963 she starred in Marisol Rumbo a Río (Marisol Is Bound for Rio), where she played twins (similar to Hayley Mills in The Parent Trap) and sang "Bossanova junto a ti" ("Bossanova Close to You"), "Muchachita" ("Little Woman"), "¡Oh, Tony!" and "Guajiras". Marisol co-starred with Robert Conrad in the 1964 film La Nueva Cenicienta (The New Cinderella), in which she sang "Me conformo" ("I Am Happy"). Mel Ferrer directed her in Cabriola (Prancer) in 1965, where she sang "Cabriola", "¡Ay, vagabundo!", "Ya no me importas nada" ("You Mean Nothing to Me") and "Sevillanas", and went shopping in Paris with Audrey Hepburn. She appeared in Búscame esa chica (Find Me That Girl) with El Duo Dinámico (a popular duet during the 1960s and 1970s). The film had biographical elements, featuring Marisol singing "Mi pequeña estrella" ("My Little Star"), "Typical Spanish" and "Solo a Ti" ("Only To You"). She had a cameo in La historia de Bienvenido (Bienvenido's Story), a story about a donkey.

As an actress
In 1967, Marisol starred in the comedy Las cuatro bodas de Marisol (The Four Weddings of Marisol), as the daughter of actress Isabel Garcés, and sang "La Boda" ("The Wedding"), "Johnny", "Belen, Belen" (with Catalan flamenco singer Peret), and "La Tarara" (inspired by a García Lorca poem). She appeared in the unsuccessful Carola de día, Carola de noche (Carola by Day, Carola by Night). In 1969, Marisol appeared in the musical comedy El taxi de Los conflictos (The Taxicab of Troubles), where she sang "Corazón contento" ("Happy Heart"), a song composed by Argentine singer Palito Ortega.

Marisol received the Best Actress prize at the Karlovy Vary International Film Festival for her role in Los Días del Pasado (The Bygone Days). Marisol also appeared in La corrupción de Chris Miller (The Corruption of Chris Miller), directed by Juan Antonio Bardem (uncle of Spanish actor Javier Bardem); La chica del Molino Rojo (The Girl from the Red Cabaret) with Mel Ferrer, and El poder del deseo (The Power of Desire) with Pilar Bardem (also directed by Juan Antonio Bardem).

As an adult, Marisol changed her stage name to her given name, Pepa Flores. More recently, Marisol appeared in Carlos Saura's film Bodas de sangre (Blood Wedding, based on García Lorca's play), and in Carmen (1983). She played the title role (a Liberal heroine) in the TVE (Spanish national television) series Proceso a Mariana Pineda in 1984, and was applauded for her lead role in the 1985's Caso Cerrado with Antonio Banderas.

Personal life and Family
On 16 May 1969, Marisol married Carlos Goyanes Perojo, son of her producer. They separated in 1972.

In 1973, she started a relationship with dancer Antonio Gades, and she has three daughters with him. María Esteve, the eldest, is an actress, and Celia Flores, the youngest, is a pop flamenco singer.  After her divorce they married in 1982 in Cuba and their godparents were Fidel Castro and Alicia Alonso. They divorced on 1986, and Gades died in 2004. She was a sympathizer (but not a member) of the Spanish Communist Party, distancing herself from the party after her separation from Gades.

Pepa Flores is retired and lives with Massimo Stecchini, her partner since 1987, in Malaga, where she works for charitable causes.

In the wake of the Me Too movement, the claims Marisol made to Francisco Umbral and Interviú in the late 1970s about the sexual abuse she underwent as a child star resurfaced in Spanish Vanity Fair in 2018.

Victoria (Grandmother)
Maria Gonzalez (Mother) – Juan Flores
Josefa Flores González (Marisol) – Antonio Gades
Maria Esteve (Daughter)
Celia Flores (Daughter)
Tamara Gades (Daughter)

Filmography

Film

Television

Awards 
1960 – Best Child Actress Award at the Venice Film Festival for her performance in A Ray of Light.
1972 – 3rd position OTI Festival prize for her song "Niña".
1978 – Best Actress Award at the Karlovy Vary International Film Festival for the film Los días del pasado (Days of the Past) directed by Mario Camus.
2020 – Honorary Goya Award

References 
Citations

Bibliography

External links 

  Marisol-Pepa Flores, la estrella malagueña de España
  Pepa Flores enterró a Marisol.

1948 births
Living people
People from Málaga
Spanish film actresses
Spanish child actresses
Spanish child singers
Spanish television actresses
20th-century Spanish actresses
20th-century Spanish singers
20th-century Spanish women singers